Subdivisions of Kyrgyzstan: the Central Asian country of Kyrgyzstan has three levels of local government. The top level is formed by the regions and the cities of republican significance. The regions are divided into districts and cities of regional significance. The districts are divided into cities of district significance, urban-type settlements and village communities.

, there are:
First level:
 7 regions
 2 cities of republican significance (Bishkek and Osh)

Second level:
 44 districts, including 4 city districts of Bishkek
 13 cities of regional significance 

Third level:
 17 cities of district significance 
 12 urban-type settlements
 453 village communities

References